HD 149837 is a binary star in the southern constellation of Ara.

References

External links
 HR 6177
 CCDM J16408-6027
 Image of HD 149837

Ara (constellation)
Binary stars
F-type main-sequence stars
6177
149837
CD-60 06381
081657